The RMS Saxon was a Royal Mail Ship that went into service with Castle Line (and its successor, the Union-Castle Line) in 1900 on the passenger and mail service run between Britain and South Africa.  She was the 4th ship by this name, the first being a coal carrier dating back to the Crimean War. After the Boer War, the Saxon was one of nine ships that made up the Southampton-Cape Town Mail Run.  In May 1901, the High Commissioner of South Africa, Lord Alfred Milner, traveled aboard the Saxon on his way back to Southampton, England. He traveled on the same route aboard the Saxon in 1925, shortly before his death.

During World War I, the Saxon was requisitioned by the government and served as a troopship in the Mediterranean and the North Atlantic, carrying American troops from New York to France.  She made six voyages across the Atlantic from May 1918 to October 1918.  She returned to service after the war, but suffered a serious fire in 1921 and had to be escorted to Freetown, Sierra Leone, where another ship picked up her passengers and mail.

The Saxon was retired in 1930, and replaced by the refrigerated ship Warwick Castle.

Footnotes

References
 Hodson, Norman, ''The Race to the Cape: A Story of the Union-Castle Line, 1857-1977", Hampshire: Navigator, 1995
 Marlowe, John, Milner: Apostle of Empire, London: Hamish Hamilton, 1976

External links
 History of the ship: Link
 A model of the ship: Link
 Post Card picture of the Saxon: Link
 The Castle Line Atlas of South Africa, London: Currie, 1895

1899 ships